The Flintstones on Ice is a 1973 American live action television special featuring characters from The Flintstones franchise directed by Walter C. Miller and produced by Hanna-Barbera Productions. It premiered on CBS on February 11, 1973.

Synopsis
The special was taped in Hamburg, Germany before a capacity crowd and starred costumed characters of Fred Flintstone,  Wilma Flintstone,  Barney Rubble and Betty Rubble (portrayed by champion ice skaters Lothar Dobberstein, Teri Tucker, Malcolm Smith and Mitsuko Funakoshi, respectively). Also featured are several other renowned skaters Donald McPherson, Cliff McArdle, Gudrun Hauss and Walter Häfner, all of whom combine stylish skating and dance techniques into one of the most rousing displays of talent and excitement on the ice, as well as blending precision and timing with an impeccable style as they perform daring acrobatics with intrepid leaps and startling spins.

The special shows The Flintstones characters interacting with the other ice-skaters displaying winter-themed performances, elaborate costumes and German-theme pieces which concludes with a big finale as the four characters perform the closing number together, joined by the others in Germanic costumes.

Flintstones cast

References

External links
The Flintstones on Ice at The Paley Center for Media
The Flintstones on Ice at The Bonham Daily Favorite, retrieved May 13, 2017.
 

1973 television specials
CBS television specials
CBS original programming
1970s American television specials
Ice shows
Television shows directed by Walter C. Miller
Hanna-Barbera television specials
The Flintstones television specials
Television shows filmed in Germany